Vyšný Slavkov is a village and municipality in Levoča District in the Prešov Region of central-eastern Slovakia.

History
In historical records the village was first mentioned in 1347.

Geography

Population 
It has a population of about 260 people (2020-12-31).

Industry

References

External links
https://web.archive.org/web/20070513023228/http://www.statistics.sk/mosmis/eng/run.html

Villages and municipalities in Levoča District
Spiš